Diez Estudios Escénicos (Ten scenic Etudes) is a musical work for the stage by Juan María Solare.

It was composed at Cologne (Germany) and Mollina (Spain), June–July 1996, and is 20'00" in length, without text. For two actors, one actress, diverse objects and instrumental sextet: violin, doublebass, horn, bass clarinet, vibraphone and piano. It is dedicated to Mauricio Kagel.

Compositions by Juan María Solare